Leonid Barkovskyy (born 13 December 1940) is a Soviet former long jumper who competed in the 1964 Summer Olympics, in the 1968 Summer Olympics, and in the 1972 Summer Olympics.

References

1940 births
Living people
Ukrainian male long jumpers
Soviet male long jumpers
Olympic athletes of the Soviet Union
Athletes (track and field) at the 1964 Summer Olympics
Athletes (track and field) at the 1968 Summer Olympics
Athletes (track and field) at the 1972 Summer Olympics